The Beethovenhalle is a concert hall in Bonn. It is the third hall in that city to bear the name of Bonn-born composer Ludwig van Beethoven.

History 
The first Beethovenhalle was a temporary structure built in 1845 during the inauguration of the Beethoven Monument, located in the Münsterplatz.  The second hall was built in 1870 for centennial celebration of Beethoven's birth. It was also wood with a stucco Neoclassical façade and a rectangular auditorium.  The interior contained galleries along the side walls and could accommodate 1,500 people.  During the next several years, the hall not only hosted concerts, but also poetry readings, boxing matches, charity bazaars, the Oberammergau Passion Play and gatherings for the Nazi Party.   The hall was destroyed on 18 October 1944 during a World War II bombing raid.

The new hall 
In 1952, the building committee recommended constructing a new hall on the site of several former university hospitals on the north edge of the old city that had been destroyed during the war.  In January 1954, the city council announced a competition to design the structure and received 109 entries from around the world.  The judging committee narrowed the field and ultimately selected the design by German architect Siegfried Wolske.  The cornerstone was laid 16 March 1956 by President of Germany Theodor Heuss. Construction concluded in 1959 and the opening concert was on 8 September 1959. Total costs were DM9 million with the national and North Rhine-Westphalia governments contributing DM 1 million each, DM 6.5 million from the city of Bonn and DM 1 million in private contributions.  Since its completion, it has become an emblem of the city and one of the most important buildings of contemporary Germany. As the earlier halls, it is characterized by an excellent acoustic and plays an important role in the preservation of Beethoven’s musical tradition. Furthermore it is the home of the Beethoven Orchester Bonn. The opening and the final concert of the Beethovenfest takes place in the large hall, which seats about 2000 guests. Prominent artists from around the world regularly perform in the Beethovenhalle and it also hosts carnivals, exhibitions, celebrations, conferences and conventions such as AnimagiC.

Spot for political and historical events 
When Bonn was the capital of West Germany, the Beethovenhalle was often an important venue for political and historical events. The Bundesversammlung met in the hall on four occasions between 1974 and 1989 to elect the President of Germany. Since 1990, the Beethovenhalle has been a protected monument. In 1996, Siegfried Wolske oversaw renovations to the building for an estimated cost of DM 22.6 million (€11.55 million) that included adding three meeting rooms to the south wing.

References

Ludwig van Beethoven
Concert halls in Germany
Buildings and structures in Bonn
Tourist attractions in Bonn
Music venues completed in 1959
1959 establishments in West Germany